Antipain is an oligopeptide that is isolated from actinomycetes and used in biochemical research as a protease inhibitor of trypsin and papain. It was discovered in 1972 and was the first natural peptide found that contained an ureylene group. Antipain can aid in prevention of coagulation in blood. It is an inhibitor of serine and cysteine proteases.

It has been crystallised in complexes with carboxypeptidase, which is obtained from wheat, and Leishmania major oligopeptidase B. In both cases, the backbone carbonyl of the terminal arginine of antipain forms a covalent bond to the active site serine in the protease.

In oncology, pain control is an ongoing problem. An important obstacle to controlling cancer pain is related to the patient. A recent research article indicated that antipain Y is a new type of anti-pain analog, which can inhibit the release of neurotransmitter in rat dorsal root ganglion neurons. An experiment focused on potential improvement for pain management of oncology patients with antipain.

A study was performed for information on the effect of antipain on the quality of post-thawed ram semen. The results from this experiment concluded that antipain aided in the quality of ram semen by maintaining the sperm mobility. Antipain includes the function to inhibit a degrading enzyme, called plasmin, permitting this substance to be able to improve the resistance of membrane disruption by freezing temperatures.

Antiretroviral and protease inhibitors 

There are several serine proteases, which are enzymes that cleave the protein bond, in the human genome. Proteases are ubiquitous. Protease function is also affected by endogenous inhibitors. The abnormal functioning of these proteases can lead to the development of cancerous tumors. Protease inhibitors or antipain are enzymes that are used to regulate their performance.

The antiretroviral drug Nelfinavir is one example of an antipain. It was classified as an antipain after a study published by Ovid that investigated the in vitro effect of Nelfinavir using proteolytic foot printing and found that it selectively inhibited HER2- positive, a growth factor in breast cancer.

Antipain is a reversible inhibitor of trypsin, papain, and, plasmin, which is isolated from actinomycetes.

Protease inhibitors and DRUG neurons 
Protease-activated receptors (PARs) are a unique class of G protein-coupled receptors activated by proteolytic cleavage of the receptor N terminus. PARs are activated by some Serine Proteases and are important for the physiological, psychological, and pathological functions of the human body.

During the study, an antipain analogue Y was developed and studied. It was shown to have properties as a protease inhibitors but it had a low IC50 than a antipain. Antipain analogue Y was able to suppress Trypsin, which inhibits the secretion of an excitatory neuropeptide that leads to inflammation and other disorders. Antipain is a protease inhibitor, usually 1–2 μg/mL, and is well-against to cathepsin A, cathepsin B, papain and trypsin protease enzymes.

References 

Peptides
Aldehydes